Frances Helen Foster (née Brown; June 11, 1924 – June 17, 1997) was an American film, television and stage actress. In addition to being an actress, Brown was also an award–winning stage director.

Life and career
Foster was born Frances Helen Brown in Yonkers, New York, the daughter of George H., a postal worker, and Helen E. Brown. She studied acting at American Theater Wing in Manhattan from 1949 to 1952. In 1955, she made her stage debut as Dolly May in The Wisteria Trees at the City Center Theater in more than 25 of its productions. Foster won an Obie Award in 1985 for sustained excellence of performance. She was also a recipient of two AUDELCO Awards, one as an actress and the other as a director for work at the New Federal Theatre in Manhattan. In 1978, she received the best actress award for Do Lord Remember Me, and the best director award in 1983 for Hospice. She also appeared in several films, including Malcolm X, Crooklyn, and Clockers, as well as the recurring role of Vera on the soap opera Guiding Light from 1985-94. She's also known from one of the most infamous episodes of Good Times, as Gertie Vinson, a neighbor of the Evans family who was forced to eat dog food in the episode "The Dinner Party".

She died in Fairfax, Virginia, from cerebral hemorrhage, June 17, 1997, aged 73.

Selected credits

Theatre

References

External links

Biography at filmreference.com

1924 births
1997 deaths
American film actresses
American television actresses
American stage actresses
Actresses from New York (state)
20th-century American actresses
20th-century American singers
People from Yonkers, New York